Obrad Vučurović (Serbian: Обрад Вучуровић), (April 1, 1922 - September 18, 2013) was a Serbian rocket engineer and general of the Yugoslav People's Army. He was leading figure in the development of rocket technology at the Military Technical Institute (VTI-Vojnotehnički Institut) in Belgrade for the Yugoslav land forces.

Military career 
He finished primary school in 1932 and high school in 1941. On July 13, 1941, he joined the partisans. He completed the war as a major in the OZNA, later moving to the UDBA. After the war he enrolled mechanical engineering faculty in Zagreb, among other things he studied with Wernher von Braun's students, who taught as visiting professors in Zagreb. One of his teachers became head of the Aerospace Center in Stuttgart. Pavle Savić, head of the Yugoslavis nuclear research program, recommended Obrad Vučurović to Paris for two courses. There he studied weapons and nuclear technology. In Paris he obtained knowledge on rocket trends in west and some of modern basics of rocket technology. Upon his return, he served in military as officer in the garrisons of Cetinje, Kotor, Zagreb and Belgrade, until he got permanently  position as head of rocket department at the Military Technical Institute (VTI) in Belgrade and  became director in the sector of the Joint Development of the Land Forces at VTI (1981-1987). He is highly decorated general for his numerous scientific and military achievements.

In Yugoslavia, the development of military missile technology goes back to the work of Obrad Vučurović. In the early 1960s, he was involved in the development of a liquid-powered Yugoslav surface-to-air missile called R-25 Vulkan (eng. Volcano) that could fly up to 25 km attitude. The Yugoslav army had allegedly bought 6pcs of the Japanese research rocket Kappa (rocket) together with launch pad and radar that was used as basis of research for domestic anti aircraft rockets. In secret Japanese rocket served as a study object for domestic military development. Modeled on the Kappa (rocket), Obrad Vučurović had the Volcano booster engine built at the Pretis (Vogosča) military plant in Sarajevo. Together with Vladimir Ajvaz he developed the engine of the second stage of the Volcano on the basis of a liquid rocket in the "SOKO" aviation company in Mostar. With the purchase of the Kappa, Yugoslavia also got new basics formula for rocket fuels. Later SPS Vitez plant produced finished blocks of smokeless solid fuel from the chemical raw materials supplied from ZORKA (Šabac) and Vitkovići (Goražde), which contributed to the further development of the engine of the R-262.

Obrad Vučurović enjoyed a particularly prestigious position within the hierarchy of generals of the Yugoslav People's Army due to his engineering knowledge about completely new technology's in rocket construction. He was responsible not only for the development of weapon systems, but also for the series production of the military-industrial complex. Due to Obrad Vučurović, some of the large arms factories constructed in Yugoslavia had reached high technological and quality standards for military products, which some factories could no longer maintain after the collapse of the country.

As a pioneer of Yugoslav rocket development, his greatest achievements was the development of the R-262 rocket and the Yugoslav M-87 Orkan multiple rocket launcher system.

Rocket and missile system designs

R-25 Vulkan 

R-25 Vulkan was surface to air rocket with development started in 1958 and Obrad Vučurović as lead engineer.

M-63 Plamen 

M-63 Plamen was developed in 1963 as multiple rocket launcher in 128mm caliber with Obrad Vučurović as project manager and chief engineer of development.

M-77 Oganj 

M-77 Oganj self-propelled multiple rocket launcher development started in 1968 with Prof. Obrad Vucurević, who led developing and managed construction and production of the M-77 Oganj.

M-87 Orkan and M-96 Orkan II

M-87 Orkan is 262mm self-propelled multiple rocket launcher development started as part of KOL-15 project in 1978. Obrad Vučurović had for KOL-15 significant financial backing both from Yugoslavia and Iraq. New rockets, launchers and vehicles where developed. Professor had practically all components designed by his engineers according to his plans, without paying to much attention to the costs as goal was to get best multiple rocket system at given time. The vehicle was also specially built in 8x8 configuration by FAP Priboj. From Germany, new equipment was bought from company Leifield for processes of cylinder press rolling for the formation of rocket engine chambers at the Pretis plant. The SPS Vitez imported new equipment for the extrusion of 160 kg of mew two-base smokeless solid fuel (NGR 375) for the chamber of the rocket engine. In total, in Yugoslavia, over 100 factories in the metal, chemical and automotive industries, telecommunications and electronics in Slovenia, Bosnia and Herzegovina and Serbia worked on the individual components of the weapon system KOL-15 and Orkan. The final montage on vehicles were don in factory "Bratstvo" in Novi Travnik, while complete rockets with detonators and fuel were finalized in Pretis-Unis (Vogošča). Special new alloys were required when choosing the steel and aluminum alloys in order to withstand pressures by new rocket engine. In particular, the launchers' pipes had to meet the highest requirements. For them, high-performance steels were produced in the Ravna steel mill in Slovenia, and the finished pipes were further processed in Pretis-Unis Bosnia nad Herzegovina. During initial tests few versions where developed and more than 500 missiles were fired. In addition to the Prevlaka and Luštica military test sites, it was Krivolak in the then Republic of Macedonia where the weapon system was also tested. The final tests for export customer took place in Iraq. A problem with the tests was the use of Cluster munition in rockets. It was not possible to use them at Prevlaka and Luštica over the Adriatic sea in order to see their deployment and explosion solid ground was needed. In Krivolak, several villages and all livestock had to be evacuated beforehand, as the sub-munitions often in test covered more area than planned. The Orkan M-87 was publicly presented on December 18, 1987. After delivery in Iraq in 1990 in the 0th series started, production stopped in 1991. Besides Iraq Turkey used Orkan M-87 as basis of their TOROS artillery rocket system after illegally obtained launcher and blueprints form Muslims in Bosnia during war. In late 1990s M-96 Orkan II modification was developed on basis of ZIL-135 vehicles that where used as part of 9K52 Luna-M.

RS-120 

As part of KOL15 project in 1989. started development of an army MRL RS-120 Uragan (eng. Hurricane) in 380mm diameter also known in latter stage of development as VERA(Velika raketa eng. large rocket) in 400mm diameter with 4 barrels and a 120 km range. During project basic engine of 120 km fire-range rocket was tested and many domestic factories where involved. While in Yugoslavia production of complete launcher did not start Iraq has produced rockets on basis of that technology known as Ababil-100 later renamed with new fuel as Al-Fat'h and mounted as single rail launchpad on 8x8 truck   while Orkan M-87 was known as Ababil-50 in Iraq. Today technology obtained through VERA project is basis for new Advanced very long range Multiple Launch Rocket System, 400 mm caliber, range 200 km, quadruple, with rockets with INS-based trajectory correction system and fragmented warhead containing tungsten balls that is in development. It was planned to start development of rocket with range of 350 km with Energoinvest Sarajevo as main investor but because of Yugoslavia war project was never finished.

Other developments 

Beside mentioned rocket systems(Vulcan, Plamen, Oganj, Orkan, VERA), professor Obrad Vučurović had other numerous project and scientific papers and task he worked on. Some of them are:

 rockets and missiles: "Svitac", VBR-1, VBR-2, BR-10, PB-10, PB-20
 scientific papers:  "Spheric Vielle's bomb construction and development";– "Fall-device Calculation and construction"; – "Recoil measuring device construction and development"; – "Missile dynamic stabilization device construction and development"; – "Rockets and multiple rocket launcher systems for 10 km ('Plamen'), 20 km ('Oganj') and 50 km ('Orkan') fire-range projects" (including assembly line production documentation); – "Preproject of Air-to-Ground 128 mm rocket";– "Air-to-Air and Air-to-Ground 57 mm rocket construction";– "Preproject of 120 km fire-range rocket and multiple launching rocket system"; – "Ground-to-Ground missile system study"; – "Light launcher PB-10 and portable launcher PB-20 project"; – "Preproject of ship-board launcher VBR-10"; – "Preproject of anti-aircraft missile "Vulkan"; – "Rocket or classical artillery analysis"; – "Very precise guided missile analysis"; – "Military system technology development analysis";  – "Antiarmour rockets and classical artillery state and perspectives analyses"; – " Precision of wind and temperature measurement using granade method"; – "Extraterrestrial space exploration with sondage rockets";

and many books about rocket constructions and technology.

References 

1922 births
2013 deaths
Serbian engineers
Yugoslav engineers